This is the list of cathedrals in Tanzania sorted by denomination.

Roman Catholic 
Cathedrals of the Roman Catholic Church in Tanzania:
 St. Theresa's Metropolitan Cathedral in Arusha
 Mater Misericordiae Cathedral in Bukoba
 Cathedral of St. Paul in Bunda
 St. Joseph's Metropolitan Cathedral in Dar es Salaam
 St. Paul of the Cross Metropolitan Cathedral in Dodoma
 Cathedral of St. Patrick in Ifakara
 Kihesa Sacred Heart Cathedral in Iringa
 Our Lady of Victory Cathedral in Kigoma
 Cathedral of Christ the King in Mahenge
 Christ the King Metropolitan Cathedral in Mbeya
 St. Patrick's Cathedral in Morogoro
 Christ the King Cathedral in Moshi
 Cathedral of the Immaculate Conception in Mpanda
 Cathedral of Holy Mary Mother of God in Musoma
 Metropolitan Cathedral of the Epiphany in Mwanza
 Cathedral of Christ the King in Same
 Mater Misericodiae Cathedral in Shinyanga
 St. Mathias Mulumba Kalemba Metropolitan Cathedral in Songea
 Cathedral of Sumbawanga
 St. Theresa's Metropolitan Cathedral in Tabora
 St. Anthony's Cathedral in Tanga
 St. Joseph's Cathedral in Zanzibar City

Anglican
Cathedrals of the Anglican Church of Tanzania:
 St Albans Cathedral Church in Dar es Salaam
 Cathedral of Musoma
 St Steven's Cathedral in Shinyanga
 Cathedral Church of St Michael and All Angels in Korogwe
 Cathedral of Ngara in Murgwanza
 Cathedral of Musoma

Lutheran
Lutheran cathedrals in Tanzania:
 Azania Front Cathedral in Dar es Salaam
Dodoma cathedral

See also
List of cathedrals

References

Cathedrals in Tanzania
Tanzania
Cathedrals
Cathedrals